Johannes Salmonsson (born February 7. 1986) is a Swedish professional ice hockey player who is currently playing for IK Oskarshamn of the Swedish Hockey League (SHL). Salmonsson was drafted by the Pittsburgh Penguins organization in the 2nd round (31st overall) of the 2004 NHL Entry Draft. His youth team was Almtuna IS.

Playing career 
Salmonsson began his professional career during the 2002 Allsvenskan playoffs with Almtuna. He made his Elitserien debut during the 2003–04 season with Djurgårdens IF of the Swedish Elitserien. He then moved to North America after two seasons with Djurgården to play one season with the Spokane Chiefs of the Western Hockey League during the 2005–06 season. The following year, Salmonsson went back to Sweden, signing as a free agent, to play for Brynäs. During his second season with Brynäs he moved to Rögle of the second-tier league HockeyAllsvenskan.

After three seasons with Linköpings HC on July 17, 2015, Salmonsson left Sweden as a free agent and signed his first contract in Germany with Kölner Haie of the Deutsche Eishockey Liga (DEL) on a one-year agreement. Salmonsson played two seasons with the Sharks before signing with second DEL club, the Iserlohn Roosters.
 
Following three seasons in the DEL, Salmonsson opted to return to his native Sweden, agreeing to terms after a successful tryout with top flight SHL club, Timrå IK, on November 8, 2018.

International play
Salmonsson has played for the Swedish national junior team at the World Junior Ice Hockey Championships on three occasions: 2003–04, 2004–05, and 2005–06. At those tournaments Salmonsson played in 17 games and scored 13 points (7 goals, 3 assists).

Career statistics

Regular season and playoffs

International

References

External links 
 

1986 births
AIK IF players
EHC Biel players
Brynäs IF players
HC Davos players
Djurgårdens IF Hockey players
Iserlohn Roosters players
Kölner Haie players
Linköping HC players
Living people
IK Oskarshamn players
Pittsburgh Penguins draft picks
Rögle BK players
Spokane Chiefs players
Sportspeople from Uppsala
Swedish ice hockey forwards
Swedish expatriate ice hockey players in the United States
Timrå IK players
Swedish expatriate ice hockey players in Germany
Expatriate ice hockey players in Switzerland
Swedish expatriate sportspeople in Switzerland